GO Transit serves the Greater Toronto Area in Southern Ontario, Canada with the following stations:

Train

Future train stations

Bus 
Barrie
Finch
Guelph
Kitchener
McMaster
Newmarket
Oshawa
Richmond Hill Centre
Scarborough Centre
Square One
Union
York Mills
Yorkdale

References

 
Lists of railway stations in Canada